The Great Stirrup Controversy is the academic debate about the Stirrup Thesis, the theory that feudalism in Europe developed largely as a result of the introduction of the stirrup to cavalry in the 8th century AD. It relates to the hypothesis suggested by Lynn Townsend White Jr. in his 1962 book, Medieval Technology and Social Change. White believed that the stirrup enabled heavy cavalry and shock combat, which in turn prompted the Carolingian dynasty of the 8th and 9th centuries to organize its territory into a vassalage system, rewarding mounted warriors with land grants for their service. 

White's book has proved very influential, but others have accused him of speculation, oversimplification, and ignoring contradictory evidence on the subject. Scholars have debated whether the stirrup actually provided the impetus for this social change, or whether the rise of heavy cavalry resulted from political changes in Medieval Europe.

White's hypothesis 

White begins by tracing the research of the 19th century German historian Heinrich Brunner, who claimed that the switch to mounted warfare occurred after the Battle of Tours with a Saracen army in 732. Brunner pointed out that Pepin the Short began demanding horses as tribute from the Saxons in 758, citing this as evidence of an increasingly cavalry-dependent army. Brunner also claimed that the Muslim incursion into Europe prompted Charles Martel to confiscate church lands to support cavalry. 

White used linguistic changes and evidence of a drastic change in weapons to support his claim that this change to mounted shock combat occurred in the early 8th century. He claimed that the francisca (Frankish throwing ax) was replaced by longswords and lances — weapons designed to be used from horseback. The lance, White says, is the strongest evidence that the Franks had adopted the stirrup by this time. He further claimed: "The feudal class of the European Middle Ages existed to be armed horsemen, cavaliers fighting in a particular manner which was made possible by the stirrup." He believed that the stirrup had enabled the knight to exist. 

This hypothesis was also supported by Canadian media theorist Marshall McLuhan. McLuhan believed transformative new technologies, like the stirrup or printing press, extend a man's abilities to the point where the current social structure must change to accommodate it. Just as the car created the Interstate Highway System, the suburb, and the oil industry, so the stirrup helped create a specialized weapon system (knights) that required land and pasture to support it and provide for training and material.

Criticisms of White's ideas 
Despite the great influence of White's book, his ideas of technological determinism were met with criticism in the following decades. It is agreed that cavalry replaced infantry in Carolingian France as the preferred mode of combat around the same time that feudalism emerged in that area, but whether this shift to cavalry was caused by the introduction of the stirrup is a contentious issue among historians. It has been asserted that armored cavalry were used successfully without stirrups before their introduction, and that the transition to cavalry was not a result of new technologies. The first fully armoured cataphracts appeared in the third century BC, almost 1000 years before the Carolingian dynasty.  White argued that they were "essentially armoured bowmen."

Sawyer and Hilton's critique 
In an April 1963 review of White's book, the scholars Peter Sawyer, of the University of Birmingham, and R. H. Hilton, were quick to point out that "the most serious weakness in this argument is that the introduction of the stirrup is not in itself an adequate explanation for any changes that may have occurred. The stirrup made new methods possible, not inevitable ... the stirrup cannot alone explain the changes that it made possible." Sawyer and Hilton further point out that the scant archaeological evidence makes it difficult to determine when the stirrup reached the Franks, as they were already Christian by the 7th century and had largely abandoned elaborate burials and grave goods. They also stated White's footnotes often contradict his thesis and evidence.

Stephen Morillo's argument 
Military historian Stephen Morillo, of Wabash College, offered a different explanation for the rise of cavalry in Medieval warfare: that of a lack of centralized government. Morillo contends that cavalry-dependent militaries are common in societies that do not have strong central governments, and cites Medieval Japan and China as analogous examples to 8th century Europe. A central government, he explains, is crucial to the development of a highly trained infantry, but cavalry can be maintained, however loosely, by an already horse-owning noble class. He writes: "Rural warrior elites were in fact a common feature of many traditional civilizations. Sons of such classes were raised to the military lifestyle, trained in small groups built from the social connections among the class, and exercised military force in the interest of maintaining their own position in the hierarchy of power." Furthermore, Morillo examines cases of Frankish warriors fighting on foot—and defeating mounted knights in the process. Even White quoted Brunner as admitting that a good infantry could break a cavalry charge if its soldiers held their ranks. Morillo used the example of the familia regis, an elite Anglo-Norman infantry unit, as further evidence that a strong central government was the key to developing a strong infantry. Therefore, Morillo considers feudalism a political construct rather than a military one.

Objections from archaeology and experiment 
It has also been asserted by some, including Richard Alvarez, that modern reenactment and experimental archaeology have shown that the stirrup provides very little benefit for a mounted lancer, and a cantled saddle and spurs have a greater effect. White noted the importance of the prior emergence of the saddle, but argued, "The stirrup made possible—although it did not demand—a vastly more effective mode of attack" (than a blow "delivered with the strength of shoulder and biceps"): "now the rider could lay his lance at rest, held between the upper arm and the body, and make at his foe, delivering the blow not with his muscles but with the combined weight of himself and his charging stallion." Stirrups provide stability for striking in melee after the initial cavalry charge.

See also
Horses in warfare
Horses in the Middle Ages
Horse tack

References

External links
 
   includes many other references

Warfare of the Middle Ages
Cavalry
Horse history and evolution
20th-century controversies
Historical controversies
Military controversies
1962 in science
Feudalism in Europe
History of technology
Technological change